Milton Busin (17 January 1927 – 16 June 1994) was a Brazilian diver. He competed at the 1948 Summer Olympics and the 1952 Summer Olympics.

References

External links
 

1927 births
1994 deaths
Brazilian male divers
Olympic divers of Brazil
Divers at the 1948 Summer Olympics
Divers at the 1952 Summer Olympics
Divers from São Paulo
Medalists at the 1951 Pan American Games
Brazilian male water polo players
Pan American Games silver medalists for Brazil
Pan American Games medalists in water polo
Water polo players at the 1951 Pan American Games
20th-century Brazilian people